40-Hour Week is the ninth studio album from American country music band Alabama. Released in 1985, the album included three songs that topped the Billboard magazine Hot Country Singles chart and continued the band's dominance during the 1980s. The album peaked at number one on the Billboard Country Albums chart and number 28 on the Billboard 200.

Two of the No. 1 tracks — "There's No Way" and the title track — became milestones in Alabama's recording career during 1985. When it reached the top of the chart on May 4, "There's No Way"  became Alabama's 16th consecutive No. 1 single (excepting for the 1982 Christmas single "Christmas in Dixie"). The feat allowed Alabama to tie Sonny James' 14-year-old record for most No. 1 songs in as many consecutive single releases. Then, on August 3, "40 Hour Week (For a Livin')" topped the chart, becoming Alabama's 17th-straight chart topper and allowing them to surpass James' record.

Among the album tracks, several of them praising the South, 40 Hour Week also features the ballad "I Want To Know You Before We Make Love", which became a major hit for Conway Twitty in 1987.

This was Alabama's only album from which all the singles had accompanying music videos.

Critical reception

Track listing

Charts

Weekly charts

Year-end charts

Singles

Certifications

Personnel
as listed in liner notes

Alabama
 Jeff Cook – electric guitar, background vocals, lead vocals on "(She Won't Have a Thing to Do With) Nobody But Me"
 Teddy Gentry – bass guitar, background vocals, lead vocals on "As Right Now"
 Mark Herndon – drums
 Randy Owen – lead vocals, electric guitar

Additional musicians
 Eddie Bayers – drums
 Kenneth Bell – acoustic guitar
 David Briggs – keyboards
 Costo Davis – Kurzweil Synthesizer
 Jack Eubanks – acoustic guitar
 Gregg Galbraith – electric guitar
 Roger Hawkins – drums
 George (Leo) Jackson – acoustic guitar
 Fred Newell – electric guitar
 Larry Paxton – bass guitar
 Willie Rainsford – keyboards
 Brent Rowan – electric guitar
 Ronnie Scaife – electric guitar
 Milton Sledge – drums

Strings by the "A" Strings, arranged by Kristin Wilkinson.

References

1985 albums
RCA Records albums
Alabama (American band) albums
Albums produced by Harold Shedd